Leonora Mary Johnson (24 July 1902 – 1 May 2000), known professionally as Nora Swinburne, was an English actress who appeared in many British films.

Early years
Swinburne was born in Bath, Somerset, the daughter of Henry Swinburne Johnson and his wife Leonora Tamar (née Brain). She was educated at Rosholme College, Weston-super-Mare, and studied for the stage at the Royal Academy of Dramatic Art. As a member of Clive Currie's Young Players in 1914, she appeared at the Grand, Croydon, Court and Little Theatres, during that year.

In 1914, she attended an audition with the ballerina Phyllis Bedells and later Anna Pavlova who considered her too young, even if very talented, for the corps de ballet. Nora instead joined the Italia Conti school where she obtained her first real part as a child actress in Where the Rainbow Ends. She performed in the show in London and in all the big cities of Britain for eighteen shillings (90p) a week.

At the end of 1915 she gained a place at the Royal Academy of Dramatic Art. While still a student at the academy she appeared at the New Theatre on 11 April 1916 as the Wild Flowers in Paddly Pools; appeared at the Comedy Theatre, September 1916, as a dancer in the revue, This and That; and in October 1916 appeared in Samples at the Globe Theatre (now the Gielgud Theatre). She also appeared at the Globe in March 1917 as Gabrielle in Suzette. Other early roles included Lulu in Yes, Uncle! at the Prince of Wales Theatre in December 1917, and Regina Waterhouse at the Strand Theatre in December 1918.

At the Apollo Theatre in 1919 she played the title role in Tilly of Bloomsbury "for about six weeks", according to her personal notes in Who's Who in the Theatre, followed by the role of Roselle in The Betrothal at the Gaiety in January 1921, concluding the year with what she charmingly called "several cinema plays".

Stage career
Subsequent theatre roles included:
Miss Dale Ogden in The Bat, St James's Theatre, January 1922
Evadne in The Mountebank, Lyceum Theatre, New York, May 1923
Sheila in Mary, Mary, Quite Contrary, Belasco Theatre, New York, September 1923
Lorna Webster in In the Next Room, St Martin's Theatre, London, June 1924
Veronica Duane in You and I, The Little Theatre, John Adam Street, London WC1, December 1924
Joan Lee Tevis in Tarnish, Vaudeville Theatre, March 1925
Nora in Number 17, New Theatre, August 1925
Marion Lennox in The Best People, Lyric Theatre, March 1926
Lady Blair in Regatta, and Ann in Outward Bound by Sutton Vane, Prince of Wales Theatre, January 1928
Susan Cunningham in The Fourth Wall, Haymarket, February 1928
Hyacinth in Out She Goes Criterion Theatre, December 1928
Sonia in Fame, St James's Theatre, February 1929 (108 performances)
Sylvia Arnitage in Murder on the Second Floor, Lyric Theatre, June 1929
Yolande Probyn in Lady Clara, Booth Theatre, New York, April 1930
Betty Mainwaring in Lucky Dip, Comedy Theatre, October 1930
Laurel Prescottin in The Ninth Man, Prince of Wales Theatre, February 1931
Helen in Disturbance, Grafton Theatre, July 1931
Fay d’Allary in The Gay Adventure, Whitehall Theatre, December 1931
Lady Moynton in Never Come Back, Phoenix Theatre, October 1932
Anne Vernon in It’s You I Want, Daly's Theatre, February 1933
Sybil Kingdom in The Old Folks at Home, Queens Theatre, December 1933
Helen Storer in Lovers' Leap, Vaudeville Theatre, October 1934
Phyllis Manton in All Rights Reserved, Criterion Theatre, April 1935
Helen Westdrake in Disturbance (for Charta Theatre), Westminster Theatre, May 1935
Marie in Sauce for the Gander, St Martin's Theatre, January 1936
Judith Godfrey in The King’s Leisure, Daly's Theatre, May 1936
Louise Dexter in The Astonished Ostrich, Duke of York's Theatre, December 1936
Tony Campion in Wise To- Morrow (Stephen Powys), Lyric Theatre, February 1937 (first co-starring with future husband Esmond Knight as Peter Marsh)
Lady Hazel in African Dawn, Daly's Theatre, May 1937
Maryka in The Laughing Cavalier, Adelphi Theatre, October 1937
Edith Cartrwright in Dodsworth, Palace Theatre, February 1938
Dinah Lot in Lot’s Wife (for London International), Duke of York's Theatre, April 1938; then under her own management at the Whitehall Theatre, June 1938; subsequently transferring to the Aldwych and Savoy Theatres.
Fanny Grey in Autumn Crocus, King's Theatre, Hammersmith, April 1939
Ann Mordaunt in Third Party Risk, St Martin's Theatre, May 1939
Mrs Oswald Pink in Married For Money, Aldwych Theatre, November 1939
Frances Courtenay in The Peaceful Inn, Duke of York's Theatre, May 1940
Mrs. Purdie in Dear Brutus (Barrie), Globe Theatre, January 1941
Sorel Tree in Ducks and Drakes, Apollo Theatre, November 1941
Carole Markoff in Full Swing, Palace Theatre, April 1942
Succeeded Valerie Taylor as Natalia Petrovna in A Month in the Country, St James's Theatre, August 1943
Succeeded Diana Wynyard as Sara Muller in Watch on the Rhine, Aldwych Theatre, October 1943
Diana Wentworth in The Years Between, Wyndham's Theatre, January 1945 ("which ran for over a year.")
Lady Clare Marten in Miranda, Embassy Theatre, June 1947
Elsa Meredith in Honour and Obey, Saville Theatre, November 1947
Caroline Ashley in Caroline, Arts Theatre, March 1949
Jane Cooper in Red Letter Day, Garrick Theatre. February 1952
Mrs. Arbuthnot in A Woman of No Importance, Savoy Theatre, February 1953
Naomi Martyn in The Secret Tent, Grand Theatre, Blackpool, October 1954
Mrs. Astley in The Lost Generation, Garrick Theatre, June 1955
Adelaide Lovell in The Call of the Dodo, Theatre Royal, Nottingham, October 1955
Catherine Hayling in Fool’s Paradise, Apollo Theatre, April 1959
Diana in I Seem To Know Your Face, Everyman Theatr, Cheltenham, June 1960
Chief Minister’s Wife in Music at Midnight (Peter Howard), Westminster Theatre, May 1962; subsequently touring the US, January 1963
Liz in All Good Children, Hampstead Theatre Club, April 1964
Violet in The Family Reunion, 69 Theatre Company, Manchester, October 1973
Julia Shuttlethwaite in The Cocktail Party, 69 Theatre Company, Manchester, September 1975

Filmography

 Branded (1920) as Doris Jerningham
 Saved from the Sea (1920) as Nancy Brooks
 The Fortune of Christina McNab (1921) as Christina McNab
 The Autumn of Pride (1921) as Peggy Naylor
 Alone in the Jungle (1922) as Lydia Gyldendal
 Wee MacGregor's Sweetheart (1922) as Jessie Mary
 The White Desert (1922) as Karin
 Hornet's Nest (1923) as Lady Rona
 The Unwanted (1924) as Joyce Mannering
 His Grace Gives Notice (1924) as Cynthia Bannock
 A Girl of London (1925) as Vee-Vee
 One Colombo Night (1926) as Jean Caldicott
 Alf's Button (1930) as Lady Isobel Fitzpeter
 Caste (1930) as Esther Eccles
 These Charming People (1931) as Julia Berridge
 A Man of Mayfair (1931) as Elaine Barclay
 Potiphar's Wife (1931) as Lady Diana Bromford
 A Voice Said Goodnight (1932) as Joan Creighton
 Mr. Bill the Conqueror (1932) as Diana Trenchard
 White Face (1932) as Inez Landor
 Perfect Understanding (1933) as Lady Stephanie Fitzmaurice
 Too Many Wives (1933) as Hilary Wildely
 The Office Wife (1934) as Anne
 Boomerang (1934) as Elizabeth Stafford
 Lend Me Your Husband (1935) as Virgie Green
 Jury's Evidence (1936) as Mary Trent
 The Gay Adventure (1936) as Fay d'Allary
 Lonely Road (1936) as Lady Anne
 Dinner at the Ritz (1937) as Lady Railton
 The Citadel (1938) as Mrs. Thornton
 Lily of Laguna (1938) as Gloria Grey
 It Happened to One Man (1940) as Alice Quair
 The Farmer's Wife (1941) as Araminta Grey
 They Flew Alone (1942) as ATA Commandant
 The Man in Grey (1943) as Mrs. Fitzherbert
 Dear Octopus (1943) as Edna
 Fanny by Gaslight (1944) as Mrs. Hopwood
 They Knew Mr. Knight (1946) as Celia Blake
 Jassy (1947) as Mrs. Hatton
 Good-Time Girl (1948) as Miss Mills
 The Blind Goddess (1948) as Lady Dearing
 Quartet (1948) as Mrs. Peregrine (segment "The Colonel's Lady")
 The Bad Lord Byron (1949) as Lady Jersey
 Fools Rush In (1949) as Angela Dickson
 Marry Me! (1949) as Enid Lawson
 Christopher Columbus (1949) as Joanna de Torres
 Landfall (1949) as Admiral's Wife
 My Daughter Joy (1950) as Ava Constantin
 The River (1951) as The Mother
 Quo Vadis (1951) as Pomponia
 Betrayed (1954) as "The Scarf's" Mother
 The End of the Affair (1955) as Mrs. Bertram
 Helen of Troy (1956) as Hecuba
 The Strange Awakening (1958) as Mrs. Friend
 Third Man on the Mountain (1959) as Frau Matt
 Conspiracy of Hearts (1960) as Sister Tia
 Decision at Midnight (1963) as Margaret
 A Man Could Get Killed (1966) as Lady Frazier (uncredited)
 Interlude (1968) as Mary
 Anne of the Thousand Days (1969) as Lady Kingston
 Up the Chastity Belt (1971) as Lady-in-Waiting

Television appearances
The Forsyte Saga (BBC, 1967) as Aunt Hester Forsyte
Fall of Eagles (BBC, 1974) as Katharina Schratt

References

Sources
 Who's Who in the Theatre, various editions, from the 8th (1936) to the 16th (1977)
London Stage in the 20th Century, Robert Tanitch, Haus Books (2007); 
 Ephraim Katz, The Macmillan International Film Encyclopedia, Pan Macmillan (1994); 
 HaIliwell's Who's Who in the Movies, 4th edition, HarperCollins (2006);

External links
 

1902 births
2000 deaths
20th-century English actresses
Actresses from Somerset
Alumni of RADA
English film actresses
English silent film actresses
English stage actresses
People from Bath, Somerset